= Katulph =

Hephthalite aristocrat and advisor of Khosrow I

Katulph was a Hephthalite aristocrat, who served as the advisor of the Sasanian king (shah) Khosrow I (r. 531–579).

== Sources ==
- Felföldi, Szabolcs (2001). "A prominent Hephthalite: Katulph and the fall of the Hephthalite Empire". Acta Orientalia Academiae Scientiarum Hungaricae. 54 (2/3): 191–202. doi:10.1556/AOrient.54.2001.2-3.2. JSTOR 23658279. (registration required)
